Tifanie Christun (born February 27, 1972) is an American voice actress. She is the daughter of Ray Lenhart and Cheryl Saban, the stepdaughter of Haim Saban, and the sister of Heidi Lenhart. She is also known as Tifany Lenhart and Tiffany Christun. She is married to musician Chris Chaney.

Filmography

Television
 A Christmas Adventure
 Digimon Adventure - Biyomon, Yokomon
 Digimon Adventure 02 - Yolei Inoue, Biyomon
 Digimon Tamers - Riley Otori
 Digimon Frontier - Minomon (5), Biyomon (44), Chiaki
 Flint the Time Detective - Sarah Goodman, Plumella
 Horseland - Pepper
 Jason and the Heroes of Mount Olympus - Venus
 Mon Colle Knights - Kahimi, Additional Voices
 Pigs Next Door - Additional voices
 Sabrina's Secret Life - Cassandra
 Speed Racer X - Trixie, Spritle
 Stargate Infinity - Stacey Bonner
 The Kids from Room 402 - Tillie
 The Secret Files of the Spy Dogs - Additional Voices
 Transformers: Robots in Disguise - Dorie Dutton

Film
 Digimon: The Movie - Biyomon, Yolei Inoue, Birthday Girl, Grocery Girl
Digimon Adventure 02: Revenge of Diaboromon - Yolei Inoue
 Digimon Tamers Runaway Locomon - Riley Otori

Crew work
 Breaker High - 2nd Music Engineer
 Casper: A Spirited Beginning - Assistant Music Engineer
 Mighty Morphin Power Rangers - Assistant Editor
 Power Rangers in Space - Music Assistant
 Power Rangers Turbo - Music Assistant

References

External links
 
 

American film actresses
1972 births
Living people
American video game actresses
American television actresses
American voice actresses
21st-century American women